On 26 June 1980, an assassination attempt on Hafez al-Assad, the Syrian president, was carried out by Muslim Brotherhood supporters who threw two grenades and fired machine gun bursts at him as he waited for an African diplomat in the Guest Palace in Damascus. Assad kicked one grenade out of range, whilst one of Assad's bodyguards threw himself on the other grenade.

The attack came in the context of the Islamist uprising in Syria. The attack on the president prompted a series of deadly retaliation by the government troops, most notably the Tadmor prison massacre, carried out the next day. Ten days later Law No. 49 was passed, making membership of the Muslim Brotherhood a capital offense.

See also
1986 Damascus bombings
1982 Hama massacre

References

1980 crimes in Syria
20th century in Damascus
Al-Assad
Crime in Damascus
History of the Muslim Brotherhood
Islamist uprising in Syria
Politics of Syria
June 1980 events in Asia
1980 murders in Syria